Ralph Neville (died 1244) was Lord Chancellor of England and Bishop of Chichester.

Ralph Neville may also refer to:
Ralph Neville, 1st Baron Neville de Raby (1262–1331), English aristocrat
Ralph Neville, 2nd Baron Neville de Raby (c. 1291–1367), English peer and soldier
Ralph Neville, 1st Earl of Westmorland (c. 1364–1425), English peer and Earl Marshal
Ralph Neville, 2nd Earl of Westmorland (1408–1484), English peer
Ralph Neville, 3rd Earl of Westmorland (1456–1499), English peer
Ralph Neville, 4th Earl of Westmorland (1497–1549), English peer and soldier
Ralph Neville-Grenville (1817–1886), British MP for Windsor, Somerset East and Somerset Mid
Ralph Neville (MP) (1848–1918), British MP for Liverpool Exchange, 1887–1895